Inti Guttu is an Indian Telugu language family and Drama series airing on Zee Telugu from Monday to Saturday at 2:00 PM from 30 November 2020 and ended on 17 December 2022. It is the remake of Hindi Television series Tujhse Hai Raabta aired on Zee TV.It is also premiering on digital platform ZEE5. It stars Shishir Shastry, Nisarga Gowda and Meena Vasu in lead roles.

Synopsis 
Kalyani, a teenager, loses her cherished mother Madhuri and is compelled to live with her step-mother Anupama. How they develop a deep unconventional bond beyond the ties of blood forms the storyline.

Cast

Main 
 Rohit Rangaswamy (2020) / Shishir Shastry (2020-2022) as Showrya; Sampada and Kalyani's husband; Dhamyanthi's son
 Nisarga Gowda as Kalyani; Ajay and Madhuri's biological daughter; Anupama's foster daughter
 Meena Vasu as Anupama; Ajay's wife; Kalyani's foster mother

Recurring 
 Sai Kiran / Kaushik Srikrishna as Ajay; Anupama and Madhuri's husband; Kalyani's father.
 Shiva Parvathi as Shiva Parvathi; Ajay, Chinny krishna and Dhamayanthi's mother
 Malladi Shivanarayana as Bhupathi; Shiva Parvathi's Husband; Ajay, Chinny krishna and Dhamayanthi's father
 Hemanth as Siddarth; Sampada's lover
 Rithu Chowdary as Sampada; Showrya's first wife and Siddarth's lover
 Rajitha as Dhamayanthi; Showrya's mother
 Lakshmi Narayana as Showrya's father
 Charishma Naidu as Pallavi
 Girish as Pallavi's husband
 Challa Chandu as Advocate
 Uma Naidu as Siddarth's mother
 Suhan Ghori as Unknown
 Neema Singh as Unknown
 Nata Kumari as Unknown

Cameo Appearance 
 Roopa Shravan as Madhuri
 Jabardasth Naveen as himself
 Anusha Prathap as Surya
 Ashika padukone as Trinayani

References

External links 

 Inti Guttu on ZEE5

Zee Telugu original programming
2020 Indian television series debuts
Indian television soap operas
Telugu-language television shows